Basiliolella is a genus of brachiopods belonging to the family Basiliolidae.

The species of this genus are found in Australia.

Species:

Basiliolella colurnus 
Basiliolella grayi

References

Brachiopod genera